Jennifer Abbott (born January 8, 1965) is a Sundance and Genie award-winning film director, writer, editor, producer and sound designer who specializes in social justice and environmental documentaries.

Born in Montreal, Quebec, Abbott studied political science with a particular interest in radical political thought, women's studies and deep ecology at McGill University. She attended law school briefly before she quit to go to Emily Carr University of Art and Design where she studied for a few years before deciding to teach herself what she needed to know to become a filmmaker. Years later, she would teach at that same university.

Abbott splits her time between Vancouver and the Gulf Islands on Canada's West Coast where she lived for many years on a renewable energy permaculture farm. She is the mother of three including twin daughters and a practicing Zen Buddhist. She is the sister of journalist Heather Abbott, the great, great granddaughter of the first Canadian born Prime Minister of Canada John Abbott and the great, great grandniece of Maude Abbott, one of Canada's first women doctors who had to challenge Bishop's University's men-only policy to be permitted to attend medical school, graduating in 1894. She is the cousin of actors Christopher Plummer and Amanda Plummer and the great, great granddaughter of R. S. Williams & Sons musical instrument makers.

Selected Filmmaking 

In 2020, Abbott released the feature documentary The Magnitude of All Things  about the emotional and psychological dimensions of the climate crisis which she wrote, directed, co-produced, edited, sound designed and narrated. The film, co-produced by the National Film Board of Canada, Cedar Island Films and Flying Eye Productions, was described by POV magazine "as poignant as it is provocative," and calls "to mind the lyrical and elegiac wonder of Terrence Malick." Tammy Bannister, Vancouver International Film Festival Programmer, called it "Perhaps the most visceral reasoned call to action for humanity since An Inconvenient Truth.” The Magnitude of All Things won the Best Canadian Feature Award at the Planet in Focus Film Festival and will have its international premiere in Amsterdam at the world's largest documentary film festival IDFA (film festival) featured in the Frontlight program. The Magnitude of All Things features stories from the climate frontlines of Nunatsiavut in Northern Canada, the Amazon Rainforest, the Great Barrier Reef, the fires of New South Wales and among others, Greta Thunberg, Anote Tong, Patricia Gualinga and Roger Hallam.

In 2020, she also released The New Corporation: The Unfortunately Necessary Sequel  (co-directed with Joel Bakan), a follow up to their international hit The Corporation which was co-directed with Mark Achbar. It premiered at the Toronto International Film Festival and Forbes has called it "The Must-See Documentary of the Year."

Abbott first started working in media with Sara Diamond and The Women's Labour History Project. In 2004, Abbott's first experimental short and multimedia work Skinned about interracial relationships, made with writer David Odhiambo, was exhibited at NY's Museum of Modern Art.

Her first feature documentary, A Cow at My Table (1998), addresses the ongoing battle between animal advocates and the meat industry. Five years in production took Abbott across Canada, the United States, Australia, and New Zealand to meet with leading activists for the animal rights movement, as well as spokespeople from the meat industry. Filming landed her in jail in Saskatchewan after she crawled under a fence on slaughterhouse property. A Cow at My Table (1998) was one of the first feature documentaries to expose and criticize intensive animal agribusiness and won several international awards.

In 2000, Abbott collaborated with director Mark Achbar to create Two Brides and a Scalpel: Diary of a Lesbian Marriage (2000). The documentary is a low-budget video diary of the first legally married lesbian couple in Canada. The film received multiple festival invitations and was later broadcast on Canadian television networks.

Abbott continued her collaboration with Achbar in 2003 when they co-directed the critically acclaimed documentary film The Corporation (2003). The film critically explores modern day corporations through the evaluation of corporate behavior towards society and the world at large. Incorporating interviews with 40 corporate insiders and real-life case studies, Abbott hopes the film will ultimately inspire strategies for change. During the directing/editing process, Abbott went through over 800 pages of interview transcripts and 400 hours of footage. The first "rough cut" was 34 hours that she whittled down into a narrative structure, in both content and emotional arc, over the course of a year. It was important to her that the documentary did not force ideas onto the audience but rather asked questions open to interpretation. During the filming of the documentary, Bakan wrote the book The Corporation: The Pathological Pursuit of Profit and Power.

Abbott completed editing the film Let It Ride: The Craig Kelly Story a week before having twin daughters in 2006 when she took a short break from filmmaking.

Abbott became involved with the documentary I Am (2011) after director Tom Shadyac saw The Corporation and invited Abbott to work as the editor and executive producer on the film. The documentary explores Shadyac's personal journey after a 2007 bicycle accident caused him to suffer from post-concussion syndrome. Abbott had an immediate connection with the film's subject matter, beliefs and core philosophy. Abbott worked remotely on the film from her home in Canada.

In 2013, Abbott was commissioned by the Netherlands' Submarine Chanel to create an experimental short for a multimedia compilation based on a chapter from Steven Poole's book Unspeak and created the short film Brave New Minds constructed entirely from footage ripped from the internet.

In 2015, Abbott co-wrote and edited Sea Blind  about the sea route opening along the northern pole due to climate change and melting ice as well as the detrimental environmental impacts of the shipping industry. She also co-wrote, co-directed and edited Us and Them which features 4 homeless people living with addictions over the course of ten years.

Awards and nominations

A Cow at My Table (1998) 
Gold Special Jury Award, WorldFest Houston 99, A Cow at My Table
Best Documentary, New Jersey International Film Festival 99, A Cow at My Table
Best Documentary, Narrowsburg International Film Festival, NY 99, A Cow at My Table
1st PRIZE, Video Awards Promoting Respect for All Life,  Latham Foundation, CA 00
Media Commendation Award, Canadian Federation of Humane Societies, 99, A Cow at My Table
Silver Certificate, Prix Leonardo International Festival of Film & TV, Italy 99, A Cow at My Table

The Corporation (2003) 
Audience Award, World Cinema, Documentary, Sundance Film Festival
Insight Award for Excellence, National Association of Film and Digital Media Artists, USA
Best Documentary, The Genie Awards, 2005
Genesis Award for Outstanding Documentary Film, United States Humane Society
Audience Award for Best Feature Length Film, Ecocinema International Film Festival, Rhodes
Best Feature Documentary, Environmental Media Association Awards
Reel Room Audience Award for Best Documentary, Sydney Film Festival
Joris Ivens Special Jury Award, International Documentary Festival, Amsterdam
NFB Best Documentary Award, Calgary International Film Festival
Best Feature Length Documentary, Ecocinema International Film Festival, Rhodes
Top Ten Films of the Year, Toronto International Film Festival Group
Best Documentary Program or Series - History/Biography/Social/Political, Leo Award
Best Direction in a Documentary Program or Series, Leo Award
Best Picture Editing in a Documentary Program or Series, Leo Award
Best Documentary (1st runner-up), Seattle International Film Festival
Special Jury Mention, Montreal New Film And Video Festival
Audience Award, Philadelphia International Film Festival
Audience Award, Vancouver International Film Festival
Audience Award, Thessaloniki Documentary Film Festival
Audience Award, FIC Brasilia International Film Festival
Audience Award (1st runner-up), Calgary International Film Festival
Audience Award (1st runner-up), Toronto International Film Festival
Unspeak: Brave New Minds (2013)

 Nominee: Prix Europa

I Am (2011) 
Documentary Award - Catholics in Media Associates (CIMA) - 2012
The New Corporation: The Unfortunately Necessary Sequel (2020)

 Nominee: Best Canadian Feature Film, Toronto International Film Festival

The Magnitude of All Things (2020)

 Best Canadian Documentary, Planet in Focus Film Festival 
 Nominee: Best Picture Editing in Documentary, Directors Guild of Canada

Personal life

Abbott is a graduate of political science from McGill University and the mother of three children, including twin daughters born in 2006 featured in her film The Magnitude of All Things. She's an early adopter of renewable energy in transport and lifestyle, an organic farmer and a practitioner of Zen Buddhism studying to take precepts in the socially engaged Zen Peacemakers Order. She splits her time between Vancouver and the Gulf Islands on Canada's West Coast.

Select filmography

Director 
 Skinned (1993) 
 A Cow at My Table (1998)
 The Corporation (2003)
 Unspeak: Brave New Minds (2013)
 Us and Them (2015)
 The New Corporation: The Unfortunately Necessary Sequel (2020)
 The Magnitude of All Things (2020)

Writer 
 Skinned (1993)
Us and Them (2015)
 Sea Blind (2015)
The Magnitude of All Things (2020)

Editor 
 Skinned (1993)
A Cow at My Table (1998)
 Two Brides and a Scalpel: Diary of a Lesbian Marriage (2000)
 The Corporation (2003)
 Let It Ride (2006)
 I Am (2011)
 Unspeak: Brave New Minds (2013)
 Sea Blind (2015)
 Us and Them (2015)
The Magnitude of All Things (2020)
Sound Design

 Skinned (1993)
Unspeak: Brave New Minds (2013)
Sea Blind (2015)
 The Magnitude of All Things (2020)

Producer 
 A Cow at My Table (1998)
 I Am (2011)
The Magnitude of All Things (2020)

References

External links 
 
The Magnitude of All Things at https://www.themagnitudeofallthings.com
The New Corporation: The Unfortunately Necessary Sequel at https://thenewcorporation.movie
The Corporation at http://thecorporation.com

Living people
Canadian documentary film directors
Canadian women film directors
Directors of Genie and Canadian Screen Award winners for Best Documentary Film
Film directors from Montreal
Anglophone Quebec people
Canadian women farmers
1965 births
Canadian women documentary filmmakers